JDR Stars is a South African football club based in Pretoria formed in 2011. The club plays in the National First Division. The club is owned by Nditsheni Nemasisi, who is an Attorney.

Players

Honours 
 2011–12 SAB League Champions (Promoted to ABC Motsepe League)
 Gauteng ABC Motsepe League Champions 2015–16, 2018–19
 National ABC Motsepe League Champions 2018–19

References

External links
 

Soccer clubs in South Africa
National First Division clubs
Soccer clubs in Pretoria